Black Devil, or Black Devil Disco Club, is an electronic disco music project by Bernard Fevre, a French musician who also released synthesizer compositions on library music albums under his own name and under the alias Milpatte.

Disco Club 
The first Black Devil release was the relatively obscure Disco Club six-track EP in 1978. The actual artist name and album title are ambiguous; releases, reviews, and even the official artist and label websites use "Black Devil" and "Black Devil Disco Club" interchangeably.

Songwriting credits on the EP named Junior Claristidge and Joachim Sherylee, aliases for Bernard Fevre and Jacky Giordano, respectively. In a 2007 interview, Fevre explained that Giordano's role was not musical; he just financed the recordings, and the co-writing credit was a way of recouping that investment.

The 1978 EP was reissued in 2004 on the Rephlex label. Collectors unaware of the original LP release initially speculated that the reissue was a hoax by Rephlex founders.

The reissue press release read as follows:

The album is similar to From Here to Eternity by Giorgio Moroder, an electronica album produced one year earlier at Musicland Studios, in Munich, Germany.

Track listings
 Disco Club
France: RCA Victor PL 37164
Italy: OUT OUT-ST 25006

 2004 "Disco Club" reissue

The 2004 reissue had four editions, some of which featured a new "128 bpm" remix by Luke Vibert under his Kerrier District alias:
UK: Rephlex CAT 146 EP

UK: Rephlex CAT 146 R

UK: Rephlex CAT 146 T

UK: Rephlex CAT 146 CD

New releases 
After the success of the reissue, Fevre started to produce music again, performing live and relaunching the Black Devil Disco Club project. He released several new albums via the Lo Recordings label: 28 After (2006), Black Devil in Dub (2007; remixes of songs from 28 After), and Eight Oh Eight (2008). A new record, Circus, was scheduled to be released April 11, 2011, and features Nancy Sinatra, Afrika Bambaataa, Faris Badwan the Horrors, YACHT, Jon Spencer (Blues Explosion), Aja Emma (Cosmetics), CocknBullKid, Nancy Fortune, and Nicolas Ker (Poni Hoax). 

 2007 - Black Devil in Dub (remixes of songs from 28 After)
 2008 - Eight Oh Eight
 2009 - Black Devil Disco Club Presents: The Strange New World of Bernard Fevre
 2011 - Circus (features Nancy Sinatra, Afrika Bambaataa, Faris Badwan the Horrors, YACHT, Jon Spencer (Blues Explosion), Aja Emma (Cosmetics), CocknBullKid, Nancy Fortune, and Nicolas Ker (Poni Hoax).)
 2013 - Black Moon White Sun
 2020 - Lucifer is a Flower

A single from the record, "My Screen", featuring Nicolas Ker, was released on 11 October 2010.

Appearances 
The dub version of the song "The Devil In Us" was featured on Grand Theft Auto IV on the fictional radio station "Electro choc"

"'H' Friend" (Free Disco Permanent Midnight remix) was featured on the third episode of the first season of the 2021 series Chucky (TV series).

References

External links
 
  (defunct)
Official Lo Recordings website
Official Black Devil Disco Club MySpace

French electronic music groups
Rephlex Records artists